In probability theory, the factorial moment is a mathematical quantity defined as the expectation or average of the falling factorial of a random variable. Factorial moments are  useful for studying non-negative integer-valued random variables, and arise in the use of probability-generating functions to derive the moments of discrete random variables.

Factorial moments serve as analytic tools in the mathematical field of combinatorics, which is the study of discrete mathematical structures.

Definition
For a natural number , the -th factorial moment of a probability distribution on the real or complex numbers, or, in other words, a random variable  with that probability distribution, is

is the falling factorial, which gives rise to the name, although the notation  varies depending on the mathematical field.

Examples

Poisson distribution

which are simple in form compared to its moments, which involve Stirling numbers of the second kind.

Binomial distribution

Hypergeometric distribution

Beta-binomial distribution

Calculation of moments
The rth raw moment of a random variable X can be expressed in terms of its factorial moments by the formula

where the curly braces denote Stirling numbers of the second kind.

See also
 Factorial moment measure
 Moment (mathematics)
 Cumulant
 Factorial moment generating function

Notes

References

Moment (mathematics)
Factorial and binomial topics